Yes Indeed may refer to:

Music

Albums
 Yes Indeed! (Pat Boone album), a 1958 album by Pat Boone
 Yes Indeed! (Ray Charles album), a 1958 album by Ray Charles
 Dinah, Yes Indeed!, a 1958 album by Dinah Shore
 Yes Indeed! (Claude Hopkins album), a 1960 album by jazz pianist Claude Hopkins
 Yes Indeed! (Tommy Dorsey album), a 1990 compilation album by Tommy Dorsey and His Orchestra
 Yes Indeed! (Jo Stafford album), 2002

Songs
"Yes, Indeed!" (1941 song), a song written by Sy Oliver and covered by Bing Crosby, Pat Boone and many others
 "Yes, Indeed", a song written and recorded by Teena Marie from her 1981 album It Must Be Magic
 "Yes Indeed" (Lil Baby and Drake song), a song by Lil Baby from his 2018 album Harder Than Ever

See also 
 Dinah, Yes Indeed!, a 1959 album by Dinah Shore